The RD-0233 (GRAU Index 15D95) and RD-0234 (GRAU Index 15D96) are liquid rocket engines, burning N2O4 and UDMH in the oxidizer rich staged combustion cycle. The only difference between the RD-0233 and the RD-0234 is that the latter has a heat exchanger to heat the pressuring gasses for the tanks.  Three RD-0233 and one RD-0234 are used on the first stage of the UR-100UTTKh ICBM. While the engine is out of production, the ICBM as well as Rokot and Strela remain operational as of 2015.

See also

UR-100N - ICBM for which this engine was originally developed for.
Rokot - launch vehicle that is a repurposed UR-100N.
Strela - launch vehicle that is a repurposed UR-100N.
Rocket engine using liquid fuel

References

External links 
 KbKhA official information on the engine. (Archived)
 Encyclopedia Astronautica information on the propulsion module.

Rocket engines of the Soviet Union
Rocket engines using hypergolic propellant
Rocket engines using the staged combustion cycle
KBKhA rocket engines